Gonzaga Regional High School is an educational establishment located in St. John's, Newfoundland and Labrador, Canada.  The school began as a Jesuit sponsored all-boys school from grades 9 to 11.  It is now a non-denominational coeducational institute for students from Grade 10 (Level 1) to Grade 12 (Level 3), with a 4th level available for those wishing to repeat courses, or those who need more credits to pass. It is adjacent to the Jesuit St. Pius X Church.  Its sports teams are known as the Vikings.

Achievements 
In the 1973–1974 school year, a team from Gonzaga (Players: Gerry Beresford, Peter Chafe, Tom Harrington, Seth Reddy, alternate: Michael Bautista) won the national championship of the television quiz show Reach for the Top.

In 2009, 2010, and 2012, Gonzaga's concert band, jazz band and choir competed in the Heritage Festival held in New York City. Both years they won the Festival Sweepstakes Award for the highest overall average of the Festival.

In 2010 The Telegram named Gonzaga High School the second best high school in Newfoundland and Labrador, and the best in St. John's.

On May 27, 2011, students and alumni of Gonzaga broke the Ga ga ball world record, having 507 players compete in the game.

Notable alumni 

 Paul Antle
 Andrew Furey
 Tom Harrington
 Gemma Hickey
 Darrell Power
 Teddy Purcell
 Anthony Stack
 Greg Thomey
 Danny Williams

Building 
The main tower of Gonzaga highschool is a 4-storey block of classrooms. Administration offices, gymnasium, skilled trade workshop and adjoining music rooms (in former chapel) are located in the street level portion of the school set outside the footprint of the tower. 

In 1987-1988 Gonzaga received major renovations and had multiple extensions built on adding a skilled trades workshop, drama rooms and no less than 12 new classrooms on the 4 floors. In accommodation with accessibility standards an elevator was added. New washrooms were constructed for the transition from an only boys school.

See also
 List of Jesuit sites

References

High schools in St. John's, Newfoundland and Labrador
Jesuit secondary schools in Canada
High schools in Newfoundland and Labrador
1962 establishments in Newfoundland and Labrador
Educational institutions established in 1962